RyeMabee, also known as Castlewood, is a historic mansion in Monteagle, Tennessee, U.S.. It was built in 1930 for Irene Mabee Gibson on a former family home. Mobster Al Capone was a frequent visitor "when he was traveling
between Chicago and his Florida estate in Miami." It was designed in the Tudor Revival architectural style. It has been listed on the National Register of Historic Places since December 22, 1997.

References

Houses on the National Register of Historic Places in Tennessee
Tudor Revival architecture in the United States
Houses completed in 1930
Monteagle, Tennessee
Al Capone